Yancy Rozal de Ocampo (born November 11, 1980) is a Filipino former professional basketball player. He is the elder brother of Ranidel de Ocampo. He is a 12-time Philippine Basketball Association (PBA) champion.

College career
Yancy started playing organized basketball with the Saint Francis of Assisi College System Doves together with his brother, Ranidel. The De Ocampo brothers led the varsity squad to several NCRAA titles. Along with Ervin Sotto, they became known as the "Triple Towers".

PBL career 
Before entering the PBA, De Ocampo played in the Philippine Basketball League for the Welcoat Paints.  He is also among the PBL's 20 Greatest Players of All-time.

PBA career

Fedex Express 
De Ocampo was the first overall pick during the 2002 PBA draft and was the first-ever draft pick of FedEx as a PBA team. He was signed to a P10.8 million contract that lasted three years.

Talk 'N Text Phone Pals 
Fedex dealt him to the Talk 'N Text Phone Pals in a series of moves that made Talk 'N Text one of the teams to beat that season. In both conferences, they made it to the Finals, where they lost.

Air 21 Express 
A month after the 2005 draft, just before the start of the 2005-06 season, De Ocampo was traded back to the Express for the first pick in that year's draft, Jay Washington.

Return to Talk 'N Text 
In the 06-07 season, De Ocampo was reacquired by Talk 'N Text in a trade. He scored his career-high of 26 points that season. He would also go on to be named to the Mythical Second Team that season.

In the following seasons, he was able to win titles alongside his brother.

Barangay Ginebra Kings 
In the offseason of the 2010 Fiesta Conference, he was sent back to Air21. Five days later, Air21 traded him to Ginebra in exchange for Rich Alvarez and Doug Kramer.

B-Meg Llamados/San Mig Coffee Franchise 
De Ocampo was then traded from Ginebra to the B-Meg Llamados along with a 2nd-round draft pick for Rico Maierhofer.

In the opening week of the 2012-13 season, he scored 22 points in a win over the Alaska Aces. That was the most he had scored since his career-high. He won three straight championships in the 2013 Governors' Cup, 2014 Philippine Cup and the 2014 Commissioner’s Cup. But he was traded midway through the 2014 Governors’ Cup which the Mixers also topped to complete their Grand Slam run.

GlobalPort Batang Pier 
On June 4, 2014, De Ocampo and Val Acuña were traded to GlobalPort Batang Pier for Yousef Taha and Ronnie Matias.

San Miguel Beermen 
De Ocampo was shipped to the San Miguel Beermen along with Gabby Espinas for Billy Mamaril and Doug Kramer. In an overtime win against the NLEX Road Warriors, he stepped up with a team-high-tying 17 points and 12 rebounds (Alex Cabagnot also had 17 points that game). In Game 1 of the 2015-16 Philippine Cup Finals, he had 18 points in a game he started with Junemar Fajardo injured. In Game 2, he had 13 points and 14 rebounds. The Beermen would go on to eventually win the championship.

In 2020, De Ocampo retired after 17 seasons in the PBA.

PBA career statistics

Season-by-season averages

|-
| align="left" | 
| align="left" | FedEx
| 33 || 21.7 || .409 || .302 || .731 || 5.6 || .4 || .3 || .6 || 7.0
|-
| align="left" | 
| align="left" | FedEx
| 42 || 24.9 || .439 || .357 || .515 || 7.0 || .7 || .4 || .8 || 8.3
|-
| align="left" | 
| align="left" | Talk 'N Text
| 75 || 20.2 || .416 || .196 || .603 || 5.6 || .3 || .2 || .6 || 6.8
|-
| align="left" | 
| align="left" | Air21
| 52 || 23.2 || .447 || .341 || .651 || 7.7 || 1.0 || .3 || .4 || 8.1
|-
| align="left" | 
| align="left" | Talk 'N Text
| 63 || 23.6 || .509 || .346 || .669 || 7.1 || 1.5 || .4 || .7 || 9.4
|-
| align="left" | 
| align="left" | Talk 'N Text
| 38 || 16.7 || .412 || .298 || .653 || 5.0 || 1.0 || .4 || .5 || 6.8
|-
| align="left" | 
| align="left" | Talk 'N Text
| 41 || 14.4 || .426 || .370 || .640 || 4.6 || .3 || .2 || .4 || 5.6
|-
| align="left" | 
| align="left" | Talk 'N Text / Barangay Ginebra
| 43 || 12.5 || .382 || .276 || .833 || 3.5 || .5 || .1 || .3 || 4.7
|-
| align="left" | 
| align="left" | Barangay Ginebra
| 25 || 12.4 || .331 || .262 || .636 || 3.4 || .7 || .1 || .4 || 5.2
|-
| align="left" | 
| align="left" | Barangay Ginebra / B-Meg
| 57 || 15.6 || .442 || .143 || .754 || 4.4 || 1.0 || .1 || .3 || 5.2
|-
| align="left" | 
| align="left" | San Mig Coffee
| 54 || 15.4 || .426 || .154 || .780 || 4.1 || 1.4 || .2 || .5 || 4.6
|-
| align="left" | 
| align="left" | San Mig Super Coffee
| 34 || 10.5 || .320 || .167 || .600 || 2.8 || .6 || .1 || .3 || 2.2
|-
| align="left" | 
| align="left" | GlobalPort
| 13 || 19.4 || .325 || .286 || .846 || 4.7 || 1.6 || .2 || .5 || 4.9
|-
| align="left" | 
| align="left" | San Miguel
| 44 || 11.1 || .388 || .286 || .769 || 3.2 || .7 || .1 || .3 || 3.2
|-
| align="left" | 
| align="left" | San Miguel
| 29 || 7.1 || .379 || .292 || .357 || 1.8 || .4 || .0 || .1 || 1.9
|-
| align="left" | 
| align="left" | San Miguel
| 19 || 7.5 || .321 || .412 || .750 || 1.8 || .3 || .0 || .1 || 2.4
|-
| align="left" | 
| align="left" | San Miguel
| 2 || 7.5 || .167 || .000 || .000 || 3.0 || 1.0 || .0 || 1.0 || 1.0
|-class=sortbottom
| align="center" colspan=2 | Career
| 664 || 16.9 || .422 || .302 || .665 || 4.8 || .8 || .2 || .5 || 5.8

Player Profile
At 6'9", he was a good outside shooter and a low post threat. He was also capable of limiting opposing centers' impact on the floor. As he got older, he became a reliable backup bigman.

References

1980 births
Living people
Barako Bull Energy players
Barangay Ginebra San Miguel players
Centers (basketball)
Philippines men's national basketball team players
Filipino men's basketball players
Basketball players from Cavite
People from Tanza, Cavite
San Miguel Beermen players
TNT Tropang Giga players
Magnolia Hotshots players
NorthPort Batang Pier players
St. Francis Doves basketball players
Barako Bull Energy draft picks